Togh's Melikian Palace, also known as the Palace of Melik Yegan or the Palace of Dizak Meliks is an 18th-century palace, located in the central part of the village of Togh (Tugh), in the disputed region of Nagorno-Karabakh. According to an inscription in the palace buildings, the structure was built in the early 1700s by Melik Yegan, an Armenian melik of Dizak. Prior to the 2020 Nagorno-Karabakh war, the property was maintained by a descendant of Melik Yegan, Alexander Yeganyan.

History 

The artistic and architectural features of the buildings included in the complex, as well as epigraphic samples show that different parts of it were built at different times. According to Mkrtchyan, who studied the monument, the first floor of the main palace building was built in the 20s and 30s of the 18th century, and the second floor in the early 19th century.

It is written in the book placed on the portal on the entrance door of the reception room:

What is mentioned in the book is also confirmed in the Persian, Turkish and Armenian language sources of that time. The inscription on the tombstone of Malik Yegan reads :

Architecture 

Located in the center of Togh, the complex measures 38 x 13.24 meters and has a rectangular shape. On the north and south-east sides of the palace, the remains of thick walls protruding from the perimeter of the castle walls remain.

Despite some minor changes, the royal palace's original appearance has largely been preserved. The guest and living rooms of the palace are grouped in three directions. Some of the rooms open directly into the courtyard of the palace. On the first floor of the north-eastern part of the palace there are two rooms. Above them, on the second floor, there is a large hall with a balcony. The rooms on the first floor are the oldest parts of the palace, and are reminiscent of arched houses. Each of the rooms on the first floor has a window, and window and door spaces are stone-framed. There are niches in the interiors of the rooms.

On the west side of the rectangular courtyard there is a building with a façade covered with well-hewn stones and a balcony with columns. With the exception of the east wall, the other three walls of this building are a continuation of the castle walls. The columnar balcony also had an additional functional feature; The balcony, which was higher than the courtyard and connected to the courtyard by a stone staircase, and became a stage during palace events. The fireplaces and deep niches in the rooms on the first floor indicate that the building was secular in nature. Although the main entrance is on the west side of the building, the stone stairs descending from the balcony on the second floor connect it with the palace courtyard.

The largest hall of the palace building is located to the right of the parade stairs, on the south–north axis. The hall has three doors. The main door is on the west wall and the other two doors are on the east. The palace's living room is located above the parade stairs and is the tallest of all the buildings. From the balcony of the room there is a scenic view of all the surrounding areas. The palace, located in the center of Togh, has been described to occupy a connection between the secular and religious buildings of the village.

The rooms on the second floor were built later and are reminiscent of Togh's traditional houses in terms of layout. Similar features of the second floor with the older part of the palace are wide window frames, wide and multi-column balconies. During the construction of the palace complex, white and yellowish limestone from the stone quarry in the Fuzuli region, as well as well-cut gray basalt stones were used.

Malik Yegan's two-storey reception room is located in the southern part of the palace, 25 meters from the castle walls. The room's original appearance has been preserved. The reception room is small, has a balcony and a double front. The entrance tympanum is built of well-hewn stones and has an inscription.

The first floor of the reception room is completely underground and connects the palace with the garrison via an underground passage. The second floor of the reception room is located at ground level. In the 19th century, city-type living rooms with balconies on three sides were built above the reception room.

Gallery

References

External links 

Khojavend District
Armenian culture
Armenian buildings in Azerbaijan
Afsharid Iran
18th century in Armenia
18th century in Azerbaijan
18th-century establishments in Iran
Palaces in Azerbaijan